Rainy Day Assembly is the debut album by American singer/songwriter Tess Wiley, released in 2001.

Track listing

Personnel
Tess Wiley – guitar, vocals
Gerry Leonard – guitar, banjo
Paul Bryan – piano, keyboards, vibraphone, bass, background vocals
Jay Bellerose – drums, percussion
Shawn Pelton – drums
Paul Bryan – producer

References

2001 debut albums
Tess Wiley albums
Albums produced by Paul Bryan (musician)